Live at SoFi Stadium is the first live album by Canadian singer the Weeknd. It was released on March 3, 2023, through XO and Republic Records. The album was recorded during two November 2022 concerts at the SoFi Stadium in Inglewood, California, as a part of After Hours til Dawn Tour. A week earlier, the concert film of the same name was released on HBO/HBO Max and became the highest debut for a music special in the history of HBO Max. The set list includes songs from the Weeknd's previous projects: Dawn FM (2022), After Hours (2020), My Dear Melancholy (2018), Starboy (2016), Beauty Behind the Madness (2015), Kiss Land (2013), and House of Balloons (2011), along with multiple songs he was featured on.

Background and release
In February 2020, The Weeknd announced he would embark on The After Hours Tour in support of the album of the same name. The tour was due to kick-off in June of that year and was to be his first tour outside of Asia since 2017's Starboy: Legend of the Fall Tour. However, due to the initial wave of the COVID-19 pandemic, the tour was originally postponed to 2021 and later, January 2022. On August 6, 2021, The Weeknd released "Take My Breath", the lead single from a new album, Dawn FM. To reflect the release of a new album while still incorporating its predecessor, he announced in October that the tour would be renamed and postponed for a third time to Summer 2022. The tour was also moved from arenas to stadiums. The new tour, titled the After Hours til Dawn Tour, was finally announced on March 3, 2022 and kicked off on July 14 in Philadelphia.

On February 2, 2023, The Weeknd announced that a concert film recorded at two sold-out shows at SoFi Stadium in Inglewood, California on November 26 and 27, 2022 would be released on HBO/HBO Max on February 25. The concert film, titled Live at SoFi Stadium, became the highest debut for a music special in the history of HBO Max. On March 1, 2023, The Weeknd announced the release of his first live album, titled after the concert film. It was released on March 3 on streaming services and as a digital download. The album, which runs for exactly 95 minutes, consists of 31 tracks, encompassing every song performed during the show in addition to the introduction and concluding segments of the concert.

Track listing

Personnel 
Adapted from HBO special closing credits.

The Weeknd – performer, executive producer, music director
Micah Bickham – director, executive producer
La Mar Taylor – executive producer, creative director
Jordy Wax – executive producer
Aaron Cooke – executive producer
Amy Barker – associate director
Patrick Greenaway – musical director, guitar
Ricky Lewis – drums
Ledaris Jones – bass
Mike Dean – synths, guitar, pre-production
Steve Hollander – stage manager
Matt Petroff – tour manager
Robert Deceglio – production manager
Jason Baeri – lightning design
Es Devlin Studio – production design
Sila Sveta – visual design
Charm La'Donna – choreographer
Alex Clark – assistant choreographer
Tanya Karn – assistant choreographer

Release history

References

External links

2023 albums
2023 live albums
The Weeknd albums